The One is a television film starring Richard Ruccolo and Meredith Monroe. It premiered on ABC Family in 2003.  It was directed by Ron Lagomarsino.

Plot summary
A chef falls in love, but the object of his affections is already engaged, so he does not pursue a relationship.  He is hired to cater the couple's wedding, and is torn between seeing his dream girl marry another and realizing his own happiness.  
The movie included Vanessa Carlton's "A Thousand Miles" as a romantic refrain.

Cast
Richard Ruccolo as Michael Blake  
Meredith Monroe as Gail Hollander   
Gabriel Hogan as Gordie Parks

External links
 

2003 television films
2003 films
ABC Family original films
Films scored by David Kitay
Films directed by Ron Lagomarsino
2000s English-language films